Charles Antoine Manhès (Aurillac, 4 November 1777 – Naples, 26 August 1854) was a French general. He worked as aide de camp to Joachim Murat and later led the repression of brigandage in the Kingdom of Naples during Murat's reign.

1777 births
1854 deaths
French commanders of the Napoleonic Wars
Commandeurs of the Légion d'honneur